Events in the year 1988 in Japan. It corresponds to Shōwa 63 (昭和63年) in the Japanese calendar.

Incumbents
 Emperor: Shōwa
 Prime Minister: Noboru Takeshita (L–Shimane)
 Chief Cabinet Secretary: Keizo Obuchi (L–Gunma)
 Chief Justice of the Supreme Court: Kōichi Yaguchi
 President of the House of Representatives: Kenzaburō Hara (L–Hyōgo)
 President of the House of Councillors: Masaaki Fujita (L–Hiroshima) until September 30, Yoshihiko Tsuchiya (L–Saitama)
 Diet sessions: 112th (regular session opened in December 1987, until May 25), 113th (extraordinary, July 19 to December 28), 114th (regular, December 30 to 1989, June 22)

Governors
Aichi Prefecture: Reiji Suzuki 
Akita Prefecture: Kikuji Sasaki 
Aomori Prefecture: Masaya Kitamura 
Chiba Prefecture: Takeshi Numata 
Ehime Prefecture: Sadayuki Iga 
Fukui Prefecture: Yukio Kurita
Fukuoka Prefecture: Hachiji Okuda 
Fukushima Prefecture: Isao Matsudaira (until 18 September); Eisaku Satō (starting 19 September)
Gifu Prefecture: Yosuke Uematsu 
Gunma Prefecture: Ichiro Shimizu 
Hiroshima Prefecture: Toranosuke Takeshita 
Hokkaido: Takahiro Yokomichi 
Hyogo Prefecture: Toshitami Kaihara 
Ibaraki Prefecture: Fujio Takeuchi 
Ishikawa Prefecture: Yōichi Nakanishi 
Iwate Prefecture:   
Kagawa Prefecture: Jōichi Hirai 
Kagoshima Prefecture: Kaname Kamada 
Kanagawa Prefecture: Kazuji Nagasu 
Kochi Prefecture: Chikara Nakauchi  
Kumamoto Prefecture: Morihiro Hosokawa 
Kyoto Prefecture: Teiichi Aramaki 
Mie Prefecture: Ryōzō Tagawa 
Miyagi Prefecture: Sōichirō Yamamoto 
Miyazaki Prefecture: Suketaka Matsukata 
Nagano Prefecture: Gorō Yoshimura 
Nagasaki Prefecture: Isamu Takada 
Nara Prefecture: Shigekiyo Ueda 
Niigata Prefecture: Takeo Kimi 
Oita Prefecture: Morihiko Hiramatsu 
Okayama Prefecture: Shiro Nagano 
Okinawa Prefecture: Junji Nishime 
Osaka Prefecture: Sakae Kishi
Saga Prefecture: Kumao Katsuki 
Saitama Prefecture: Yawara Hata 
Shiga Prefecture: Minoru Inaba 
Shiname Prefecture: Nobuyoshi Sumita 
Shizuoka Prefecture: Shigeyoshi Saitō 
Tochigi Prefecture: Fumio Watanabe
Tokushima Prefecture: Shinzo Miki 
Tokyo: Shun'ichi Suzuki 
Tottori Prefecture: Yuji Nishio 
Toyama Prefecture: Yutaka Nakaoki
Wakayama Prefecture: Shirō Kariya  
Yamagata Prefecture: Seiichirō Itagaki 
Yamaguchi Prefecture: Toru Hirai 
Yamanashi Prefecture: Kōmei Mochizuki

Events
March 13: Seikan Tunnel opens, connecting Hokkaido and Honshu by rail for the first time.
March 17: Tokyo Dome completed.
April 4 and 5: Rock band Boøwy hold their last concert in Tokyo Dome and break up.
April 10: Great Seto Bridge opens.
April 16: Studio Ghibli films My Neighbor Totoro and Grave of the Fireflies are released simultaneously.
June 18: Asahi Shimbun breaks the Recruit scandal.
July 16: The anime film Akira is released.
July 21: A heavy torrential rain with debris flow in Kake, Hiroshima Prefecture and Hamada, Shimane Prefecture, According to Fire and Disaster Management Agency of Japan official confirmed report, 27 persons lost their lives, 45 were wounded.      
July 23: A sports fishing boat, Fuji Maru No. 1, collides with a submarine, Nadashio, in Tokyo Bay, resulting in the former sinking and 30 deaths as well as 17 injuries.
September 14: Daiei purchases the Nankai Hawks baseball team: they become the Fukuoka Daiei Hawks.
October 3: Anpanman premieres on Nippon TV. 
October 19: Orix purchases the Hankyu Braves baseball team: they become the Orix Braves.
October 23: Super Mario Bros. 3 is released for the Famicom, a slightly modified version is released for the NES in February 1990.
December 9: Finance Minister Kiichi Miyazawa resigns amid the Recruit scandal.
December 27: Takeshita announces a realigned cabinet.
December 30: According to a Japan National Police Agency official confirmed report, an armored car with 222.5 million yen in cash and 170 million yen in checks was robbed in Suma-ku, Kobe, Hyogo Prefecture. The suspect is escape continue, and still not detained, according to JNPA official.

Births

January 
January 1: Saori Hara, AV idol, model, and actress
January 2: Yusuke Suzuki, race walker
January 8: Ryuichi Dogaki, football player
January 13: Maon Kurosaki, singer-songwriter (died 2023)
January 28: Sanada, wrestler

February 
February 7: Ai Kago, performer
February 8: Nozomi Sasaki, glamour model
February 12: Nana Eikura, model, actress, and occasional radio show host
February 15: Hironori Kusano, singer and actor
February 19: Miyu Irino, voice actor
February 26: Hitomi Niiya, long-distance runner

March 
March 11: Katsuhiko Nakajima, professional wrestler
March 22: Noriko Kijima, gravure idol and actress
March 27: Atsuto Uchida, footballer

April 
April 5: Asumi Nakata, child model and voice actress
April 13: Tsubasa Aizawa, professional baseball player
April 16: Shogo Akiyama, professional baseball player
April 19: Haruna Kojima, singer, actress and idol

May 
May 1: Takeshi Suzuki, alpine skier
May 18: 
Hirooki Arai, Japanese racewalker
Tatsuma Ito, tennis player
May 26: Akito Watabe, Nordic combined skier
May 28: Meisa Kuroki, actress, model, and singer

June 
June 1: Nami Tamaki, singer
June 11
Yui Aragaki, model, actress and singer
Ayako Kimura, sprinter
June 22: Miliyah Kato, pop and urban singer-songwriter
June 27: Chisato Fukushima, track and field sprint athlete 
June 28
Gaku Hamada, film and television actor
Kanon Wakeshima, singer and cellist

July 
July 15: Maiko Kano, volleyball player
July 26: Sayaka Akimoto, singer, actress and idol

August 
August 17: Erika Toda, actress

September 
September 2: Keisuke Kato, actor and entertainer
September 7: Daiki Sato, footballer (d. 2010)
September 8: Rie Kaneto, Olympic swimmer
September 13: Nobuyuki Tsujii, pianist and composer
September 18: Yuichi Sugita, tennis player
September 20
Arisa Sato, model and weather-caster
Chiaki Satō, actress
Ayano Ōmoto, singer and dancer
September 23: Kairi Sane, professional wrestler and actress
September 25: Mariya Ise, voice actress
September 26: Yūdai Ōno, professional baseball player
September 29: Osama Elsamni, football player

October 
October 2: Kirara Asuka, model adult video actress
October 6: Maki Horikita, actress and endorser
October 17: Yuko Oshima, idol, singer and actress
October 20: Risa Niigaki, J-pop singer

November 
November 1: Ai Fukuhara, table tennis player
November 7: Kim Chae-Hwa, figure skater
November 8: Honami Tajima, actress
November 14: Takurō Ōno, actor
November 26: Yumi Kobayashi, fashion model

December 
December 4: Miki Kanie, archer
December 14: Hayato Sakamoto, professional baseball player
December 19: Mami Matsuyama, idol
December 23: Eri Kamei, J-pop singer
December 26: Kayo Satoh, model and television personality

Deaths
January 2: Yukio Kasahara, general (b. 1889)
March 1: Yoshi Katō, actor (b. 1913)
April 10: Shigeo Sugiura, freestyle swimmer and Olympic gold medalist (b. 1917)
April 23: Eitaro Ozawa, actor (b. 1909)
May 23: Aya Kitō, writer (b. 1962)
June 14: Prince Kan'in Haruhito, career officer (b. 1902)
August 4: Toshio Doko, business leader (b. 1896)
November 4: Takeo Miki, former prime minister (b. 1907)
November 23: Kenzō Masaoka, anime creator (b. 1898)
December 25: Shōhei Ōoka, writer (b. 1909)
December 30: Takeo Fujisawa, businessman, co-founder of Honda Motor Co., Ltd. (b. 1910)

Statistics
Yen value: US$1 = ¥122 (low) to ¥135 (high)

See also
 1988 in Japanese television
 List of Japanese films of 1988

References

 
Years of the 20th century in Japan
Japan